"Cheap Thrills" is a song by Australian singer and songwriter Sia from her seventh studio album, This Is Acting (2016). It was written by Sia and Greg Kurstin, and produced by Kurstin. It was originally released on 17 December 2015, and an official remix version of "Cheap Thrills" featuring Jamaican singer Sean Paul was made available for digital download on 11 February 2016 as the album's second single. This version was nominated for the Grammy Award for Best Pop Duo/Group Performance.

In the United States, "Cheap Thrills" peaked at number one on the US Billboard Hot 100 becoming Sia's first number one single in the chart, and Paul's first since "Temperature" in 2006; it also topped the national Mainstream Top 40 and Radio Songs charts. It reached the top position in many countries, including Austria, Canada, France, Germany, Ireland, Italy, Mexico, Portugal, Spain; as well as the top-10 in Australia, Denmark, Finland, the Netherlands, New Zealand, Poland, Switzerland, and the United Kingdom, where it peaked at number two on its UK Singles Chart. At the APRA Music Awards of 2018, "Cheap Thrills" won Most Played Australian Work Overseas for its songwriters, Sia and Kurstin. It won the award again at the APRA Music Awards of 2019 and again at the APRA Music Awards of 2020. “Cheap Thrills” became the second best-selling single of 2016 worldwide.

Background and composition
"Cheap Thrills" was written by Sia and Greg Kurstin, and produced by Kurstin. It was originally intended to be performed by Rihanna for her album Anti (2016), but was rejected. It is a "bouncy", "reggae-tinged" synthpop and dancehall song. The song features "a constant tropical beat and electropop-style synth layers".

"Cheap Thrills" is written in the key of F minor and set in a common time, 4/4 time.  The vocal range in the song spans an octave, from B3 to B4.

For certain radio stations, instead of the lyric "turn the radio on", Sia sings the name or call sign of the radio station.

Critical reception
Brittany Spanos of Rolling Stone called it a "bouncy party anthem", whilst The Guardian described it as "a perfectly serviceable party tune". Nick Levine of NME praised the track's production "and there's no denying this is another superior slab of on-trend ear candy from one of pop's finest songwriters." A CBS affiliate's critic wrote that the song was the No. 3 song that "saved 2016", calling it a "formidable hit".

Year-end lists

Chart performance
In Australia, "Cheap Thrills" was eventually certified quadruple platinum for shipments of over 280,000 copies, and reached No. 6. In New Zealand, the song reached No. 3, and was certified double platinum for sales of over 30,000 copies. The song was awarded quadruple platinum in Sweden, quintuple platinum in Spain, and Double Diamond in Poland. In the UK, it peaked at No. 2 for four weeks, and has since been certified quintuple platinum for shipments of over three million units.

The song became the best selling and highest certified single in Italy for a female artist, reaching 10× platinum status, with sales of over 500,000 copies. On 25 September 2017, the song received a Diamond certification in Italy, making Sia the first female singer to ever achieve such status.

In the United States, the song debuted at No. 81 and peaked at No. 1 on the Billboard Hot 100 in the issue dated 6 August 2016. The song became Sia's first number-one single in the country, and Sean Paul's fourth; he returned to the top 10 after ten years. It stayed on top for four straight weeks until it was dethroned by "Closer" by the Chainsmokers featuring Halsey. With "Cheap Thrills," Sia became the first woman over 40 to top the Hot 100 since Madonna topped the Hot 100 with "Music" in 2000. It sold 1.7 million copies in the US in 2016, becoming the tenth best-selling song of the year in the country. It sold 1.9 million copies in the US by May 2017. In 2022, It was certified octuple platinum for sales of over 8.000.000 copies.

"Cheap Thrills" was the second best selling single of 2016 after "Can't Stop The Feeling" by Justin Timberlake. On Spotify, "Cheap Thrills" became Sia's most streamed song on the platform with more than two billion streams (1.5 billion for the solo version and 500 million for the feat version).

Live performances
Sia has performed "Cheap Thrills" on various television shows and concerts, with a group of dancers usually led by either Maddie Ziegler or Stephanie Mincone dancing to the same choreography as in the music video, including The Tonight Show Starring Jimmy Fallon in January 2016, American Idol in March, Coachella in April, and YouTube's Brandcast event in New York City as well as the season finale of The Voice, both in May.

Music videos
A lyric video featuring Sean Paul performing a new verse was released on 10 February 2016. In the video, a faceless couple wearing wigs (two dancers Minn Vo and Stefanie Klausmann), which have become part of Sia's signature look, win a dance contest on a retro 1960s black-and-white TV show reminiscent of American Bandstand or The Buddy Deane Show, using visual effects to recreate the look of early 1960s television cameras. The video, directed by Lior Molcho, has been viewed more than 1.6 billion times.

Sia and Daniel Askill directed a performance video featuring Maddie Ziegler dancing with two male dancers (Wyatt Rocker and Nick Lanzisera) to Ryan Heffington's choreography, which was released on 21 March 2016. A trio of dancers wear nude-coloured, with black and blonde hairstyles and gloves in the half-and-half style used in most of Sia's videos for This Is Acting. They dance on a plain stage, with Sia at a rear corner in the background singing into a microphone while wearing a similar bobbed two-toned wig, a large hairbow and a white dress. Billboard wrote that "the video features the same type of intense, captivating choreography as some of [Sia's] other work. This time, Ziegler is backed by two other dancers, and the trio seems to blend as one". Teen Vogue said that Ziegler "delivers another powerful performance". The music video was nominated for Best Video at the ARIA Music Awards of 2016.

Track listing
Digital download
"Cheap Thrills" (featuring Sean Paul) – 3:44
"Cheap Thrills" – 3:30

Digital download - Remixes EP
"Cheap Thrills" (Hex Cougar Remix) – 3:49
"Cheap Thrills" (featuring Sean Paul) (Le Youth Remix) – 3:39
"Cheap Thrills" (RAC Remix) – 4:09
"Cheap Thrills" (Nomero Remix) – 4:11
"Cheap Thrills" (Sted-E & Hybrid Heights Remix) – 5:35
"Cheap Thrills" (Cyril Hahn Remix) – 4:45
"Cheap Thrills" (John J-C Carr Remix) – 5:16
"Cheap Thrills" (Remix) (featuring Nicky Jam) – 3:32

Charts

Weekly charts

Year-end charts

Decade-end charts

Certifications

See also
 Greg Kurstin production discography
 List of Airplay 100 number ones of the 2010s
 List of best-selling singles
 List of number-one dance singles of 2016 (U.S.)
 List of Billboard Hot 100 number-one singles of 2016
 List of Billboard Hot 100 top 10 singles in 2016

References

cheap thrills lyrics - sia ft. sean paul

External links
 
 
 

Sia (musician) songs
2016 singles
2015 songs
APRA Award winners
Billboard Hot 100 number-one singles
Canadian Hot 100 number-one singles
Irish Singles Chart number-one singles
Number-one singles in Austria
SNEP Top Singles number-one singles
Number-one singles in Germany
Number-one singles in Greece
Number-one singles in Israel
Number-one singles in Italy
Number-one singles in Portugal
Number-one singles in Romania
Number-one singles in Scotland
Number-one singles in Sweden
Dancehall songs
Song recordings produced by Greg Kurstin
Songs about dancing
Songs written by Greg Kurstin
Songs written by Sia (musician)
RCA Records singles
Songs containing the I–V-vi-IV progression